is a single-member constituency of the Japanese House of Representatives, the lower house of the National Diet. It is located on the island of Honshu, in Gunma Prefecture, and includes the cities of Isesaki and Kiryu, among others.

Areas Covered

Current District 
As of 24 January 2023, the areas covered by this district are as follows:

 Kiryū
 Isesaki
 Midori
 Sawa District

As part of the 2022 redistricting, every city in Gunma Prefecture except for Takasaki were consolidated into indivudal districts.

Areas from 2013-2022 
From the first redstricting in 2013 until the second redistricting in 2022, the areas covered by this district were as follows:

 Kiryū (Excluding the former villages of Niisato and Kurohone)
 Isesaki
 Ōta
 Yabuzuka, Yamanokami, Yoriai, Ohara, Rokusengoku, Okubo
 Midori (Kasakake and Omama)
 Sawa District

Areas from before 2013 
From the creation of the district in 1994, until the first redistricting in 2013, the areas covered by this district were as follows:

 Kiryū
 Isesaki
 Sawa District
 Nitta District
 Yabuzukahon
 Kasakake
 Yamada District

Elected Representatives

Election Results

References 

Gunma Prefecture
Districts of the House of Representatives (Japan)